Buttiauxella ferragutiae  is a bacterium from the genus of Buttiauxella which has been isolated from soil in France.

References 

Enterobacteriaceae
Bacteria described in 1996